The Hong Kong Most Popular Horse of the Year is an honor given in Hong Kong thoroughbred horse racing. It is awarded annually by the Hong Kong Jockey Club (HKJC).
The honour is part of the Hong Kong Jockey Club Champion Awards. This award is decided by a public vote.

Winners since 2001

References
Hong Kong Jockey Club News Archive

Horse racing awards
Horse racing in Hong Kong